A towel rails radiator or a heated towel rail is a feature designed to heat towels before using them. For many years, European hotels have used them as combined towel- dryers/racks. The towel warmer is a bathroom heater suitable for both drying and heating towels and the environment. There are two versions: traditional ones that are plumbed like a radiator with water heated from a central boiler, and electric ones where an electrical resistance heats water or oil contained in the unit.

Composition and functioning 
Towel dryers can be made from different metals such as steel, stainless steel, or aluminum. In some types, brass or copper is used. The finish can be in chrome plating, polished steel, or lacquer.

Dryers can be heated electrically (heating cartridge or heating cable), or by circulating hot water (connected to the central heating). Often, a combination of the methods is used. In these cases, the dryer is heated by hot water in wintertime, and by electricity in the summer.  A towel dryer, with high output, can also serve as a radiator in a small bathroom.

Dryers come in a variety of appearances, including: ladder types, turnable types, and others.

Advantages and disadvantages

Advantages 

The first advantage of this radiator is the aesthetic value that can help to enrich rooms with a touch of style. Another advantage is obviously the possibility of drying towels more quickly because they are put in direct contact with the radiant body. The towel warmer uses less water than a classic plate radiator or a cast iron radiator, so it is considered a little more ecological and more economical in terms of consumption. Its shapes are very different from each other and this can allow us to structure radiator, adapting it perfectly to rooms. There are towel warmers of different sizes, from the smallest (even of 27 in × 20 in - 70 cm × 50 cm) to larger ones that can even reach 79 in (2 meters) in height.

Disadvantages 
The first disadvantage is directly linked to one of its advantages, namely the possibility of drying our towels faster. The problem is that covering part of the pipes and the radiant body, the energy, consumption and time required to bring the room to temperature will be bigger than a radiator free of “obstacles”. It is from this need that radiator accessories and hangers have been developed, in this specific case to maintain the advantages by eliminating some disadvantages. Another shortcoming is the poor heating power, linked to the positioning of the tubes which is reverse to the sense of convection. To heat larger rooms, it needs to be larger, losing the aesthetic value.

Note

See also 
 Radiator (heating)
 Radiator reflector
 Thermostatic radiator valve

Residential heating appliances
Bathroom equipment